Adolfo Marsillach Soriano (January 25, 1928 – January 21, 2002) was a Spanish actor, playwright and theatre director. He was born in Barcelona.

He was known for his collaborations with playwright Alberto Miralles.

He is the father of actresses Blanca Marsillach and Cristina Marsillach.

Partial filmography

 Mariona Rebull (1947) - Darío Rueda
 Cerca de la ciudad (1952) - Padre José
 Don Juan Tenorio (1952) - Capitán Centellas
 Jeromín (1953) - Felipe II
 Flight 971 (1953) - Doctor
 Torrepartida (1956) - Rafael
 La cárcel de cristal (1957) - Julio Togores
 El frente infinito (1959) - Padre Herrera
 Salto a la gloria (1959) - Santiago Ramón y Cajal
 Un hecho violento (1959) - Captain Clark
 Maribel and the Strange Family (1960) - Marcelino
 Police Calling 091 (1960) - Andrés Martín
 Mi calle (1960) - Gonzalo
 Peace Never Comes (1960) - López
 Searching for Monica (1962) - Daniel Ferrero
 Historia de una noche (1962) - Daniel Romero
 Alegre juventud (1963) - Padre Ramón
 La pandilla de los once (1963) - Toni 'El Jefe'
 The Black Tulip (1964) - Baron La Mouche
 Le repas des fauves (1964) - Le docteur
 Los dinamiteros (1964) - Actor en 'Rapiña en Golden City' (uncredited)
 El tímido (1965)
 The Wild Ones of San Gil Bridge (1966) - Sacerdote
 Una historia de amor (1967) - Gómez
 Camino de la verdad (1968)
 El certificado (1970) - Víctor Escuder
 Flor de santidad (1973) - Conde de Añobre
 The Regent's Wife (1974) - Víctor Quintanar
 La cruz del diablo (1975) - Cesar del Rio
 El hombre de los hongos (1976) - Everardo / father
 La ciutat cremada (1976) - Francesc Cambó
 Al servicio de la mujer española (1978) - Julio Hernández / Soledad
 El poderoso influjo de la luna (1981) - Emilio
 Sesión continua (1984) - José Manuel Varela
 The Heifer (1985) - Marqués
 Delirios de amor (1986) - Juan Bautista Salgado (segment "Delirio 1")
 Esquilache (1989) - Carlos III
 The Long Winter (1992) - Casimiro Casals (final film role)

References

External links

1928 births
2002 deaths
People from Barcelona
Catalan dramatists and playwrights
Best Supporting Actor Goya Award winners
20th-century Spanish dramatists and playwrights